The 1945–46 UCLA Bruins men's basketball team represented the University of California, Los Angeles during the 1945–46 NCAA basketball season and were members of the Pacific Coast Conference. Led by seventh-year head coach Wilbur Johns, the Bruins were 8–16 overall and were third in the PCC southern division with a record of 5–7.

Previous season

The Bruins finished the regular season with a record of 12–12 and won the  PCC southern division for the first time with a record of 3–1.

Roster

Schedule

|-
!colspan=9 style=|Regular Season

Source

References

UCLA Bruins men's basketball seasons
Ucla
UCLA Bruins Basketball
UCLA Bruins Basketball